Tommy Paul defeated the defending champion, Denis Shapovalov, in the final, 6–4, 2–6, 6–4, to win the singles title at the 2021 Stockholm Open. This was Paul's first ATP Tour title.

Seeds
The top four seeds receive a bye into the second round.

Draw

Finals

Top half

Bottom half

Qualifying

Seeds

Qualifiers

Lucky losers

Qualifying draw

First qualifier

Second qualifier

Third qualifier

Fourth qualifier

References

External links
 Main draw
 Qualifying draw

Singles